5258 Rhoeo, provisional designation: , is a Jupiter trojan and member of the Eurybates family from the Greek camp, approximately  in diameter. It was discovered on 1 January 1989, by Japanese astronomer Yoshiaki Oshima at the Gekko Observatory, east of Shizuoka, Japan. The assumed C-type asteroid belongs to the 90 largest Jupiter trojans and has a rotation period of 19.9 hours. It was named from Greek mythology after Rhoeo, lover of Apollo and mother of his son Anius.

Orbit and classification 

Rhoeo is a dark Jovian asteroid orbiting in the leading Greek camp at Jupiter's  Lagrangian point, 60° ahead of the Gas Giant's orbit in a 1:1 resonance (see Trojans in astronomy). It orbits the Sun at a distance of 4.8–5.6 AU once every 11 years and 9 months (4,303 days; semi-major axis of 5.18 AU). Its orbit has an eccentricity of 0.08 and an inclination of 6° with respect to the ecliptic. The body's observation arc begins with its official discovery observation at Gekko Observatory in January 1989.

Eurybates family 

Rhoeo is the member of the small Eurybates family, named after its parent body, 3548 Eurybates. This asteroid family comprises 218 known members of carbonaceous and/or primitive composition, and is one of only a few families identified among the Jovian asteroids; with four of them in the Greek camp. This potentially collisional family was first characterized by Jakub Rozehnal and Miroslav Brož in 2011, and further described in 2014. Other members of this family include the Jupiter trojans 8060 Anius, 9818 Eurymachos,  and 360072 Alcimedon. In the HCM analysis by Milani and Knežević, however, Rhoeo belongs to the background population.

Numbering and naming 

This minor planet was numbered by the Minor Planet Center on 14 July 1992. On 14 May 2021, the object was named by the Working Group Small Body Nomenclature (WGSBN), after Rhoeo from Greek mythology, who became the lover of Apollo and by him the mother of Anius. When her father discovered her pregnancy, he believed she was impregnated by a man rather than a god. He placed her in a chest and cast her out to sea. Anius later prophesied the decade-long siege of Troy.

Physical characteristics 

Rhoeo is an assumed, carbonaceous C-type asteroid. The overall spectral type of members of the Eurybates family is that of a C- and P-type. It has a high V–I color index of 1.01.

Rotation period 

In April 2015, the so-far only lightcurve was obtained by Robert Stephens at the Center for Solar System Studies in Landers, California. The photometric observations gave a rotation period of  hours and a brightness variation of 0.14 magnitude.

Diameter and albedo 

According to the survey carried out by the NEOWISE mission of NASA's Wide-field Infrared Survey Explorer, Rhoeo measures 53.28 kilometers in diameter and its surface has an albedo of 0.052, while the Collaborative Asteroid Lightcurve Link assumes a standard albedo for a carbonaceous asteroid of 0.057 and calculates a diameter of 50.77 kilometers based on an absolute magnitude of 10.2.

Notes

References

External links 
 Long-term evolution of asteroid families among Jovian Trojans, Jakub Rozehnal and Miroslav Brož (2014)
 Asteroid Lightcurve Database (LCDB), query form (info )
 Discovery Circumstances: Numbered Minor Planets (5001)-(10000) – Minor Planet Center
 
 

005258
005258
Discoveries by Yoshiaki Oshima
Named minor planets
19890101